Skeletophyllon tempestua is a moth in the family Cossidae. It was described by Thomas Pennington Lucas in 1898. It is found in Australia, where it has been recorded from Queensland.

References

Zeuzerinae
Moths described in 1898